The Portuguese Albums Chart ranks the best-performing albums in Portugal, as compiled by the Associação Fonográfica Portuguesa.

References 

2000 in Portugal
2000 record charts
Portuguese record charts